Sri Panwa Phuket is a weekend house project and a five star luxury hotel with Pool Villa Style by using contemporary tropical design located on the tip of Panwa cape, southeastern part of Phuket Island.

References

Hotels in Thailand
Buildings and structures in Phuket province